Cory Harrower (born July 20, 1989) is a Canadian Paralympic wheelchair basketball player.

Biography
Harrower was born on July 20, 1989, in Regina, Saskatchewan with cerebral palsy. Between 2006 and 2007 she got 6 bronze medals in total. She won 2 bronze medals in 2006 and 2007 respectively, one of which was from Canada Games, while the other was from Junior National Championships. She also got 4 more bronze medals from World Junior Athletics Championships in 2006. Besides basketball she also plays do track and wheelchair rugby. Aside from playing rugby, she is also a member of the Canadian national wheelchair rugby team. 2007 brought her a Saskatchewan Youth Award. Harrower also used to appear in certain TV episodes of Corner Gas and on Renegadepress.com site.

References

1989 births
Living people
Paralympic wheelchair basketball players of Canada
Sportspeople from Regina, Saskatchewan
Canadian women's wheelchair basketball players